Naratasty (Narataśtı) is a rural locality (a selo) in Sharansky Selsoviet, Sharansky District, Bashkortostan, Russia. The population was 735 as of 2010. There are 21 streets.

Geography 
Naratasty is located 4 km southwest of Sharan (the district's administrative centre) by road. Sharan is the nearest rural locality.

References 

Rural localities in Sharansky District